Bruce Fowler  is an American football coach and athletics administrator.  He was the head football coach and athletic director at Lakeway Christian Academy in Morristown, Tennessee.  Fowler was the head football coach at Furman University in Greenville, South Carolina from 2011 to 2016, compiling a record of 27–43. He was named the head coach of the Furman Paladins football program in December 2010 and resigned on December 2, 2016.

Head coaching record

College

References

External links
 Lakeway Christian Academy profile

Year of birth missing (living people)
Living people
American football defensive backs
Furman Paladins football coaches
Furman Paladins football players
Vanderbilt Commodores football coaches
High school football coaches in South Carolina
High school football coaches in Tennessee
Players of American football from Cincinnati